Alexander James Jordan Norris (born 4 February 1984) is a British Labour and Co-operative Party politician. He is the Member of Parliament for Nottingham North, and was first elected at the 2017 general election.

Early life and career
Norris was born in Altrincham as a result of IVF and educated at the Manchester Grammar School. He moved to Nottingham in 2003 to study at the University of Nottingham.

Norris served as a member of Nottingham City Council, for Basford ward for six years and served as Portfolio Holder for Adults and Health. Before being elected to Parliament in 2017, Norris was working for UNISON as an Area Organiser.

Parliamentary career
In his maiden parliamentary speech, Norris called for an end to poverty. He later spoke about issues such as voter registration and modern slavery. In 2018, he called for a debate on the introduction of safe standing in English football.

On 5 March 2019, Norris was appointed as acting Shadow Minister for the Department of International Development.

Norris nominated Lisa Nandy in the 2020 Labour Party leadership election.

From 2017, Norris served as Parliamentary Private Secretary to Shadow Health Secretary Jonathan Ashworth until February 2019. He also served as an Opposition Whip from February 2019 until his appointment as Shadow Minister for Prevention, Public Health and Primary Care in Keir Starmer's first opposition frontbench.

In the November 2021 British shadow cabinet reshuffle, he became Shadow Minister for Levelling Up, assisting Lisa Nandy.

Personal life
Norris is a keen runner, is a supporter of Manchester City FC and has two pet border collies.

References

External links

1984 births
Living people
Labour Co-operative MPs for English constituencies
UK MPs 2017–2019
UK MPs 2019–present
Politicians from Manchester
Politicians from Nottingham